Jason Kubler was the defending champion but chose not to defend his title.

Shang Juncheng won the title after defeating Emilio Gómez 6–4, 6–4 in the final.

Seeds

Draw

Finals

Top half

Bottom half

References

External links
Main draw
Qualifying draw

Lexington Challenger - 1
2022 Men's singles